Store-Standal is a small village in the Hjørundfjord section of Ørsta municipality, Møre og Romsdal, Norway. The village has a population of approximately 20 people. Store-Standal is located along the Hjørundfjorden midway between the villages of Sæbø and Festøy. There is a ferry service from this village to Midt-Trandal (across the fjord) and the on to Sæbø (further down the fjord).

As with many villages in rural areas, populations have been gradually decreasing as living off the land is no longer viable in modernized countries. In an effort to increase the influx of people again, Store-Standal is undertaking projects to modernize the local industries and create tourism. Here there is a new power station, wireless internet service, and development of an Alpine Center for new residents and tourists.

References

External links
Standal Alp Centre Project

Villages in Møre og Romsdal
Ørsta